Orio may refer to:

People
Notable people with this name include:

Surname
 Baltasar de Echave Orio (late 16th century – mid-17th century), Basque Spanish painter
 Shane Orio (born 1980), Belizean football player

Given name
 Orio Mastropiero (died 1192), Venetian doge
 Orio Palmer (1956–2001), American firefighter

Places
 Orio (Kitakyūshū), Japan
 Orio, Spain
 Orio al Serio, Italy
 Orio Canavese, Italy
 Orio Litta, Italy

Other
 Orio Station, Japan
 Orio al Serio International Airport